Events from the year 1751 in Denmark.

Incumbents
 Monarch – Frederick V
 Prime minister – Johan Ludvig Holstein-Ledreborg

Events

Births
 11 August – Poul de Løvenørn, naval officer (died 1826)

Full date missing
Birgitte Winther, opera singer (died 1809)

Deaths
 January – Carl Marcus Tuscher, polymath: portrait painter, printmaker, architect, and decorator (born 1705 in the Holy Roman Empire)
 19 December – Queen Louise, Queen of Denmark-Norway (born 1724 in England)

References

 
Years of the 18th century in Denmark
Denmark
Denmark
1750s in Denmark